The Seekers is a British comic strip drawn by John M. Burns, written by Les Lilley, succeeded by Phillip Douglas and Dick O'Neil. The strip ran from 1966 to 1971 in The Daily Sketch.

Synopsis
The main characters, Susanne Dove and Jacob Benedick, are two preferred secret agents employed by Una Frost, director of "The Seekers", an elite agency of missing persons retrieval. Their investigations frequently lead to adventures connected to the sex industry, exploiting the attractiveness of both detectives, and usually leading to the downfall of sexual predators and oppressors.

Publication history
The Seekers began publication on 2 May 1966 in The Daily Sketch. The concept of the strip bears some resemblance to another strip Burns later drew for a brief period, Modesty Blaise. The female characters were consistently drawn in an enticing manner, indicating Burns' evident intent to challenge the limits of the daily British newspaper strip conventions of the times. The initial writer Les Lilley was succeeded by Phillip Douglas starting with episode 14, The Missing Golfers, occasionally aided by Dick O'Neil, who wrote one story, The Curse of the One-Eyed Sailor.

The strip ended on 10 May 1971, abandoned due to its lack of lasting success. The name, Seekers, translates to Bloodhounds in Swedish, Norwegian, Danish and Finnish publications of the strip.

Story list

Sources

 The Seekers - Spårhundarna 
 John M. Burns bio FFF 

Footnotes

External links
 The Seekers archives on Thrilling Adventures!

Crime comics
British comic strips
1966 comics debuts
Comics characters introduced in 1966
British comics characters
Fictional British secret agents
Fictional secret agents and spies in comics
Spy comics
1971 comics endings